Brandon Bank is a hamlet in Cambridgeshire, England, although most of its buildings lie across the River Little Ouse in Norfolk. The population is included in the Cambridgeshire civil parish of Littleport.

References

Hamlets in Cambridgeshire
Littleport